Laura Ellen Howard is an Irish artist who made contributions through her employment in RTÉ from 1998 - 2000.

Note: The IMDB Page for this artist contains incomplete information. The artist was employed from 1998 in RTÉ, and not 1999 as the page suggests.

Filmography

References

External links

Living people
Irish television personalities
Year of birth missing (living people)